Brazilian destroyer Paraná may refer to:

  (pennant number D29), the former American  USS Sample (FF-1048); acquired by the Brazilian Navy in 1989 and classed as a destroyer; decommissioned in 2004; sunk en route to scrappers in India in 2005

Brazilian Navy ship names